London Action Plan is a scheme to endorse worldwide spam enforcement cooperation and address unnecessary email-related problems, such as online fraud and deception, phishing, and distribution of internet viruses.  The members also start  the Action Plan for contribution by other interested administration and community agencies, and by proper personal sector council, as a way to develop the network of entities engaged in spam enforcement cooperation.

Background 
On October 11, 2004, government and communal agencies from 27 nations accountable for implementing rules in relation to spam met in London to talk about global spam enforcement assistance. At this gathering, a wide range of spam enforcement organizations, plus data guard agencies, telecommunications groups and shopper protection companies, convened to chat about international spam enforcement cooperation. numerous private sector representatives also acted as a team in fractions of the gathering.

References 
 London Action Plan
 International Consumer Protection and Enforcement Network

Computer viruses
Spamming
Email
2004 in London
Action plans